Settlers Hospital is a Provincial government funded hospital for the Makana Local Municipality area in Grahamstown, Eastern Cape in South Africa.

The hospital departments include Emergency department, Paediatric ward, Maternity ward, Gynaecology Services, Out Patients Department, Surgical Services, Medical Services, Operating Theatre & CSSD Services, Pharmacy, Anti-Retroviral (ARV) treatment for HIV/AIDS, Post Trauma Counseling Services, Occupational Services, X-ray Services, Physiotherapy, NHLS Laboratory, Laundry Services, Kitchen Services and Mortuary.

References
 Eastern Cape Department of Health website - Cacadu District Hospitals
 Settlers Hospital

Hospitals in the Eastern Cape
Buildings and structures in Makhanda, Eastern Cape